Ōshima, Nagasaki may refer to:
 Ōshima, Nagasaki (Kitamatsuura), former village, now part of Hirado, Nagasaki
 Ōshima, Nagasaki (Nishisonogi), former town, now part of Saikai, Nagasaki